Richibucto may refer to:

Richibucto, a town in New Brunswick, Canada
Richibucto Parish, New Brunswick, a parish in Canada
Richibucto River, in eastern New Brunswick